Oles Stanislavovych Dovgiy (born 1 November 1980) is a Ukrainian businessman, politician and philanthropist currently serving as a non-partisan People's Deputy of Ukraine of the 8th and the 9th convocations.

During his time in the Verkhovna Rada of the 8th convocation, he served as a co-chair of the parliamentary group on inter-parliamentary relations with Austria, and a member of the parliamentary group on inter-parliamentary relations with Montenegro. He was a member of the Economic Policy Committee and a secretary of the Will of the People parliamentary group.

During his time in the Verkhovna Rada of the 9th convocation, he serves as the Chairman of the Health Insurance Subcommittee of the Verkhovna Rada Committee on Health of the Nation, Medical Care and Medical Insurance.  

In the Verkhovna Rada, Dovgiy represents the interests of industrialists, entrepreneurs and employers, and chairs the Office of Business Representatives in the Parliament.

Biography 

He was born into the family of Stanislav Dovgiy – scientist, businessman and politician. His mother is Larysa Dovga Doctor of Philosophy, Professor of the National University "Kyiv-Mohyla Academy". Grandfather – Oleksiy Dovgiy, a famous Ukrainian writer and a poet, the author of 36 publications translated into 12 languages. Grandmother – Maria Dovga, Honorary Teacher of Ukraine. Wife – Irina, sons Makariy and Matvij.

Education 

 1997 – graduated with Honors from the regular school No. 58 in Kyiv.
 Studied at the Anglo European School of English in Bournemouth (UK) under the international student exchange program. He graduated from the Economics and Business course at Kensington College of Business
 2002 – graduated from Kyiv National Economic University with a degree in international economics and law. with a degree in manufacturing marketing.
 2015 – graduated from the National University "Odessa Law Academy" with a degree in law.
 2012-2014 – graduated from the МBА program for top-level managers at INSEAD – The Business School for the World.
 Holds a PhD in Economics.

Professional career 

Oles Dovgiy started working in 1997 as a legal assistant at the Ukrainian Association of Young Lawyers. Starting 1998, he worked as an assistant to the head of the insurance company Credo Classic (now UNICA Ukraine). Oles was one of the managers of the Nova Records and Western Thunder group of companies and was the founder of the first Ukrainian DVD company. Along with his partners, he established one of the pioneering Ukrainian internet service providers and Synerhiya Company, the first company in the Ukrainian market to start selling advertising in movie theaters. Dovgiy and his partners founded the country's first online store selling audio and video content.

Among Dovgiy's early business projects was a joint publishing project with ABABAGALAMAGA Publishing House, which published and sold more than 5 million children's books of the Mini-Dyvo series. This was the biggest number of books in the history of Ukrainian book publishing.

According to his tax declaration, Oles Dovgiy made his first million dollars at the age of 21.

Political career 
In the 2006, local election Oles Dovgiy was elected to Kyiv City Council, where he was later elected Deputy chairman and Secretary of Kyiv City Council.

In the 2008, snap elections to Kyiv City Council, he was re-elected as a council member and as Deputy chairman and Secretary of Kyiv City Council for a second term.

In 2011, Oles Dovgiy resigned as Secretary of Kyiv City Council at his own request protesting against the policies of Viktor Yanukovych.
In October 2014, during the snap parliamentary election, he was elected People's Deputy of Ukraine in constituency No. 102 (Kirovohrad oblast).

On 18 September 2015, MP Dovgiy joined the Will of the People group of MPs as one of its leaders. 

On 10 November 2016, Dovgiy was elected as official representative of industrialists, entrepreneurs and employers in the Parliament. He also chaired the Office of Business Representatives in the Verkhovna Rada. Later, his parliamentary immunity was lifted by the Ukrainian parliament on 11 July 2017, because of suspicions of fraud with land. However, the Specialized Anti-Corruption Prosecutor's Office soon closed the case against Oles Dovgiy and found the accusations baseless. 

 
On 21 July 2019, Dovgiy was re-elected as a People's Deputy in the snap parliamentary election in constituency No. 102 (Kirovohrad oblast).

Family business 
Oles Dovgiy is a partner in the business that belongs to his senior family members. In terms of doing business, the most significant family projects were the development and sale of Kyiv Radio Equipment Plant that built computers and notebooks and had licensed manufacturing of Sanyo and Philips TV-sets. 

The Dovgiy family also established the Chumatskiy Shlyakh food supermarket chain, which they sold in 2015 to the Velyka Kyshenya supermarket chain, a leading market player.

After the sale of these two business projects, the family focused its efforts on development, real estate, and private medicine. The group is a real estate partner to the Dobrobut network of health clinics. 

In addition to real estate and development, the family has a grocery supply project dealing with imports of premium food products, and a chain of luxury electronic stores Bang & Olufsen.

Charity 
In April 2011, he founded the "Together We Can Charitable" Foundation to support educational projects for children, youth and parents. The Foundation operates in three areas: sports and healthy living, educational programs, and social projects.

Hobbies  
Oles plays saxophone and loves to cook. He is fond of Ukrainian painting and patronizes a number of cultural and artistic projects. He is a collector of contemporary Ukrainian art and owns about 100 various art objects.

Awards 
 Order of St. Andrew the Apostle, the First-Called, 1st class (September 2008).
 Order of Merit, 3rd class (Decree of the President of Ukraine of 28 May 2009).

links

External links 
 Dovgiy Oles at Facebook
 Oles Dovgiy and Katerina Gorina Foundation

1980 births
Businesspeople from Kyiv
Living people
Eighth convocation members of the Verkhovna Rada
Politicians from Kyiv